Valentin Ilie Coca (born 9 February 1987) is a Romanian former footballer who played as a goalkeeper for teams such as FC Argeș Pitești, CS Mioveni, FC Caransebeș or Cosmos Aystetten, among others.

References

External links

1987 births
Living people
Sportspeople from Timișoara
Romanian footballers
Association football goalkeepers
FC Argeș Pitești players
CS Mioveni players
ACS Poli Timișoara players
Liga I players
Liga II players
Romanian expatriate footballers
Romanian expatriate sportspeople in Germany
Expatriate footballers in Germany